Cross-country skiing at the 1990 Asian Winter Games took place in the city of Sapporo, Japan with six events contested — three each for men and women.

Medalists

Men

Women

Medal table

References
Results of the Second Winter Asian Games

 
1990 Asian Winter Games events
1990
Asian Winter Games